Michael Earl Schoeffling (born December 10, 1960) is an American former actor and model. He is known for playing the role of Jake Ryan in Sixteen Candles, Al Carver in Wild Hearts Can't Be Broken, Kuch in Vision Quest, and Joe in Mermaids.

Early life and education
Schoeffling was born in Wilkes-Barre, Pennsylvania, and raised in South Jersey. He graduated from Cherokee High School in Evesham Township, New Jersey. He attended Temple University in Philadelphia, where he majored in liberal arts. In the mid-1980s he began modeling for GQ, and photographer Bruce Weber paid for his acting classes at the Lee Strasberg Theatre Institute in Manhattan.

Acting career
Schoeffling came to international prominence at the age of 23 for his role as Jake Ryan, the popular yet sensitive high school athlete on whom Molly Ringwald's character has a crush in the teen film Sixteen Candles. For Valentine's Day in 2004, twenty years after the film's American premiere, The Washington Post published an article entitled "Real Men Can't Hold a Match to Jake Ryan of Sixteen Candles", which discussed the character's enduring appeal.

He appeared in eight additional films after Sixteen Candles, including roles in Vision Quest and Mermaids, and starring roles in the 1986 action film Let's Get Harry and 1991's Wild Hearts Can't Be Broken.

Post-acting career
Since giving up acting, he has produced handcrafted furniture as the owner of a woodworking shop.

Filmography

See also

References

External links
 

1960 births
Living people
20th-century American male actors
American male film actors
Cherokee High School (New Jersey) alumni
Male models from Pennsylvania
Lee Strasberg Theatre and Film Institute alumni
Male actors from New Jersey
Male actors from Pennsylvania
Actors from Wilkes-Barre, Pennsylvania
Temple University alumni